The Courage LC75 is a Le Mans Prototype race car, designed, developed and built by French manufacturer Courage, based on the Courage LC70 LMP1 car, and designed by Courage to compete in the LMP2 class in the Le Mans Series and the 24 Hours of Le Mans.

The car was transformed by HPD (Honda Performance Development) into the American Le Mans Series-winning Acura ARX-01.

Awards

While the LC75 itself wasn't very successful, its evolution, redesigned and engineered by HPD took several titles in the American Le Mans Series. The car did not enjoy the sporting and commercial success of its predecessor the Courage C65.

Chassis

Only two chassis have carried the name LC75, no other LC70 chassis has been configured for the LMP2 category.

Chassis n°1 is the first of the LC70 & LC75 series, it was used in 2006 for driving tests and tune-ups. Noël Del Bello Racing used it in 2007 before it was used again for testing as part of Oreca's development of the FLM09 in 2008. It has been owned by Pegasus Racing since 2009.

Chassis n°2 was purchased by Saulnier Racing, which entered it on behalf of Swiss Spirit in 2006 and under its own name in 2007. After the team was taken over by Jacques Nicolet, the car was replaced by the Pescarolo 01 and is sold to Ibañez Racing Service.

References

Le Mans Prototypes
24 Hours of Le Mans race cars
Rear-wheel-drive vehicles
Mid-engined cars
Sports prototypes
Cars of France
2000s cars
C60
Cars introduced in 2007